Joshua "JJ" Donnelly (born 6 March 1997) is an English footballer who plays as a forward for Greenville Triumph SC in USL League One.

Career
Donnelly was a student at The Abbey School, Faversham and played academy football for Brentford and Dover Athletic.

College
Donnelly began playing college soccer at Eastern Florida State College, where he played two seasons before transferring to Campbell University in 2017.

While at college, Donnelly played with National Premier Soccer League side Jacksonville Armada U-23 in 2016, and USL PDL side SIMA Águilas in 2018.

Following college, Donnelly continued in the PDL, now rebranded as USL League Two, with South Georgia Tormenta FC 2.

Professional
On 8 August 2019, Donnelly signed for USL League One side Greenville Triumph SC.

References

External links
 
 

1997 births
Living people
Association football forwards
Jacksonville Armada U-23 players
SIMA Águilas players
Tormenta FC players
Greenville Triumph SC players
Campbell Fighting Camels soccer players
English footballers
English expatriate sportspeople in the United States
English expatriate footballers
National Premier Soccer League players
USL League Two players
USL League One players
English Muslims